Nur al-Din Arslan Shah I (or Arslan Shah) was the Zengid Emir of Mosul 1193–1211. He was successor of Izz al-Din Mas'ud.

See also
 Zengid dynasty

1234 deaths
Zengid emirs of Mosul
Year of birth unknown
Turkic rulers
12th-century Turkic people